Christian Byers  (born 31 July 1993) is an Australian actor. In 2006, he made his film debut in Opal Dream, before featuring in December Boys alongside Daniel Radcliffe. In 2007, he portrayed Jacob in Hey, Hey, It's Esther Blueburger.

Filmography

Television

Film

Awards

References

External links 

Australian male film actors
Australian male child actors
Living people
1993 births
Male actors from Sydney